The Southern Spirit was a luxury rail cruise train operated by Great Southern Rail in Australia. The train was launched in June 2008 and was planned to travel all over Australia, with the first service originally planned to have run in November 2008. The train was planned to operate from November to February each year, and combine train travel with overnight hotel stays, and other experiences similar to land excursions during sea cruises.

The inaugural journey departed on 9 January 2010 travelling from Uluru to Brisbane over 13 nights. The itinerary included Kings Canyon, Alice Springs, Coober Pedy, Kangaroo Island, Phillip Island and the Hunter Valley.

Service
Passengers on the train were accommodated in five 'Platinum class' carriages refurbished at a cost of $12 million, with compartments twice the size of the 'Gold class' carriages on other Great Southern services, and feature double beds rather than two bunks. At the end of the cruise season, the carriages were transferred for use on The Ghan. The cost of each tour was between $7,000 and $14,000 depending on the cruise and the class of travel. Haulage of the train is provided by Pacific National NR class locomotives, as with other Great Southern services with NR84 and NR85 repainted into a special livery for the train at Chullora in September 2008. The carriages were Commonwealth Engineering built stainless steel carriages built in the late 1960s for use on the Indian Pacific and Trans-Australian.

Each rail cruise during a season was intended to cover a different route, travelling to cities already visited by Great Southern Rail such as Katherine, Darwin, Adelaide, Perth, and Sydney; and tourist locations that are not, such as Brisbane, Canberra, Coffs Harbour, and the Hunter Valley. From 2010 the tours were concentrated on Adelaide and Melbourne to Brisbane with services operated in January 2010, January 2011 and February 2012.

References

Notes

Bibliography

 
 
  
 

Discontinued railway services in Australia
Interstate rail in Australia
Luxury trains
Named passenger trains of Australia
Railway services introduced in 2010
Railway services discontinued in 2012
2010 establishments in Australia
2012 disestablishments in Australia